Bingham County is a county in the U.S. state of Idaho. As of the 2020 United States Census, the population was 47,992. The county seat and largest city is Blackfoot.

Bingham County comprises the Blackfoot, ID Micropolitan Statistical Area, which is included in the Idaho Falls-Rexburg-Blackfoot, ID Combined Statistical Area.

History
Bingham County was created January 13, 1885. It was named for Henry H. Bingham, a congressman from Pennsylvania and friend of William Bunn, Idaho's Territorial Governor. The county was formed from Oneida County and was later partitioned itself to form Bannock (1893), Fremont (1893), Bonneville (1911), Power (1913), and Butte (1917) counties.

Geography
The Snake River flows southwest through the middle of Bingham County; at the county's southwest corner the river flows into the American Falls Reservoir. At the SE county corner is the Blackfoot Reservoir and Dam, impounding waters of the Blackfoot River. Outflow from the Blackfoot Dam flows northwesterly through the lower part of Bingham County, discharging into the Snake River.

Smaller buttes called the East Butte and the Middle Butte located in the Snake River Plain are visible south of US Route 20.

Adjacent counties

Jefferson County - north
Bonneville County - east
Caribou County - southeast
Bannock County - south
Power County - southwest
Blaine County - west
Butte County - northwest

Highways

 - Interstate 15
 - US 20
 - US 26
 - US 91
 - SH-39

Demographics

2000 census
As of the 2000 United States Census, there were 41,735 people, 13,317 households, and 10,706 families in the county. The population density was 20 people per square mile (8/km2). There were 14,303 housing units at an average density of 7 per square mile (3/km2). The racial makeup of the county was 82.43% White, 0.17% Black or African American, 6.70% Native American, 0.57% Asian, 0.03% Pacific Islander, 7.95% from other races, and 2.14% from two or more races. 13.30% of the population were Hispanic or Latino of any race. 23.6% were of English, 12.5% American, 8.9% German and 5.1% Danish ancestry.

There were 13,317 households, out of which 44.60% had children under the age of 18 living with them, 66.70% were married couples living together, 9.80% had a female householder with no husband present, and 19.60% were non-families. 17.10% of all households were made up of individuals, and 7.70% had someone living alone who was 65 years of age or older. The average household size was 3.10 and the average family size was 3.52.

The county population contained 34.90% under the age of 18, 9.70% from 18 to 24, 25.30% from 25 to 44, 19.70% from 45 to 64, and 10.30% who were 65 years of age or older. The median age was 30 years. For every 100 females there were 100.00 males. For every 100 females age 18 and over, there were 97.90 males.

The median income for a household in the county was $36,423, and the median income for a family was $40,312. Males had a median income of $31,950 versus $21,591 for females. The per capita income for the county was $14,365. About 9.90% of families and 12.40% of the population were below the poverty line, including 16.30% of those under age 18 and 7.20% of those age 65 or over.

2010 census
As of the 2010 United States Census, there were 45,607 people, 14,999 households, and 11,731 families in the county. The racial makeup of the county was 80.6% white, 6.5% American Indian, 0.6% Asian, 0.2% black or African American, 0.1% Pacific islander, 9.8% from other races, and 2.1% from two or more races. Those of Hispanic or Latino origin made up 17.2% of the population. In terms of ancestry, 22.3% were English, 12.7% were German, 5.9% were American, and 5.0% were Irish.

Of the 14,999 households, 43.6% had children under the age of 18 living with them, 62.4% were married couples living together, 10.5% had a female householder with no husband present, 21.8% were non-families, and 18.5% of all households were made up of individuals. The average household size was 3.02 and the average family size was 3.45. The median age was 31.8 years.

The median income for a household in the county was $44,128 and the median income for a family was $51,750. Males had a median income of $39,703 versus $25,815 for females. The per capita income for the county was $18,633. About 13.2% of families and 14.7% of the population were below the poverty line, including 18.4% of those under age 18 and 10.5% of those age 65 or over.

Communities

Cities

 Aberdeen
 Atomic City
 Basalt
 Blackfoot
 Firth
 Shelley

Census-designated places

 Fort Hall
 Groveland
 Moreland
 Riverside
 Rockford

Unincorporated communities

 Alridge
 Cerro Grande
 Clarkson
 Coffee Point
 Collins
 Jameston
 Gibson
 Goshen
 McDonaldville
 Morgan
 Pingree
 Rising River
 Rose
 Springfield
 Sterling
 Thomas
 Wapello
 Wolverine
 Woodville

Politics
Bingham County voters are reliably Republican. In no national election since 1948 has the county selected the Democratic Party candidate.

Education
School districts include:
 Aberdeen School District 58
 Blackfoot School District 55
 Bonneville Joint School District 93
 Firth School District 59
 Shelley Joint School District 60
 Snake River School District 52

See also
 National Register of Historic Places listings in Bingham County, Idaho

References

External links

Official Bingham County, Idaho website

                       

 
Idaho counties
Idaho Falls metropolitan area counties
1885 establishments in Idaho Territory
Populated places established in 1885